Myndtown (sometimes formerly spelt Mindtown) is a small village and civil parish in rural Shropshire, around 5 miles to the north-east of Bishop's Castle.

The village of Myndtown itself lies immediately beneath the slope of the Long Mynd; it consists of only one farm, the former rectory and the small parish church of St. John the Baptist, which has 12th-century origins and is Grade II* listed. The parish is sparsely populated and includes some other small settlements such as Asterton.

See also
Listed buildings in Myndtown

References

Civil parishes in Shropshire
Villages in Shropshire